The Park of Montagnola is a public park in Bologna, Italy; it owes the original construction (1805) to Napoleonic rule, who commissioned the park design from Giovanni Battista Martinetti.

The base of the park contains the ruins of the 14th-century Castello di Galliera, which then leads to a scenographic staircase (1893-1896), designed by Tito Azzolini and Attilio Muggia. The stairs are decorated by sculptural reliefs and statues inspired by the history of Bologna, completed by the Arturo Orsoni, Pietro Veronesi, Tullo Golfarelli, Ettore Sabbioni, and Arturo Colombarini. The parks central basin was completed for the Exposition of the Province of Emilia in 1888, by design of Diego Sarti.

References

Bologna
Parks in Emilia-Romagna